The Eastern Region Women's Football League is at the fifth and sixth levels of the English women's football pyramid, with the seven other Regional Leagues – London & SE, Southern, South West, East Mids, West Mids, North East and North West. The Eastern Region Women's Football League feeds directly into the FA Women's National League Division One South East, and lies above the Bedfordshire and Hertfordshire Football League, Cambridgeshire Football League, Essex County League, Norfolk Football League, and Suffolk Football League in the pyramid. The pyramid structure was founded in 1998.

The Eastern Region Women's Football League includes teams from the counties of Bedfordshire, Cambridgeshire, Essex, Hertfordshire, Norfolk and Suffolk, plus a team each from London and Northamptonshire who were part of the league prior to the reorganisation of the women's football pyramid.

Teams

Premier Division

Division One North

Division One South

Previous winners

References
General

ERWFL Archives from erwfl.co.uk. Retrieved on 18 February 2009.

Specific

 from The FA Full Time Website for all fixtures, results and league tables

External links
Official website of the Eastern Region Women's Football League
Eastern Region Women's Football League at FA Full Time